Abbas Qoli Khan Qajar (Persian: عباس قلیخان قاجار); was a Qajar prince. He was the son of Mohammad Hasan Khan Qajar and brother to Agha Mohammad Shah.

References

Bibliography
 

Qajar princes